The pied avocet (Recurvirostra avosetta) is a large black and white wader in the avocet and stilt family, Recurvirostridae. They breed in temperate Europe and across the Palearctic to Central Asia then on to the Russian Far East. It is a migratory species and most winter in Africa or southern Asia. Some remain to winter in the mildest parts of their range, for example in southern Spain and southern England. The pied avocet is one of the species to which the Agreement on the Conservation of African-Eurasian Migratory Waterbirds (AEWA) applies.

Taxonomy 
The pied avocet was one of the many bird species originally described by Carl Linnaeus in his landmark 1758 10th edition of Systema Naturae, where it was given the binomial name of Recurvirostra avosetta. This species gets its English and scientific names from the Venetian word avosetta. It appeared first in Ulisse Aldrovandi's Ornithologia (1603). While the name may refer to black and white outfits once worn by European advocates or lawyers, the actual etymology is uncertain. Other common names include black-capped avocet, Eurasian avocet or just avocet.

It is one of four species of avocet that make up the genus Recurvirostra. The genus name is from Latin recurvus, "curved backwards" and rostrum, "bill". A 2004 study combining genetics and morphology showed that it was the most divergent species in the genus.

Description
 
The pied avocet is a striking white wader with bold black markings. Adults have white plumage except for a black cap and black patches in the wings and on the back. They have long, upturned bills and long, bluish legs. Males and females look alike. The juvenile resembles the adult but with more greyish and sepia tones.

The call of the avocet is a far-carrying, liquid, melodious kluit kluit.

Behaviour
These birds forage in shallow brackish water or on mud flats, often scything their bills from side to side in water (a feeding technique that is unique to the avocets). They mainly eat crustaceans and insects.

Their breeding habitat is shallow lakes with brackish water and exposed bare mud. They nest on open ground, often in small groups, sometimes with other waders. Three to five eggs are laid in a lined scrape or on a mound of vegetation.

In Britain
The pied avocet was extirpated as a breeding species in Great Britain by 1840. Its successful recolonisation at Minsmere, Suffolk, in 1947 led to its adoption as the logo of the Royal Society for the Protection of Birds. The pied avocet has spread inland and northwards and westwards in Britain since then and it has bred in Wales and in Scotland in 2018 at Skinflats. Avocets have been sighted wintering at Browhouses, Dumfries and Galloway.

Gallery

References

External links

 (Pied) avocet species text in The Atlas of Southern African Birds
 
  
 
 
 

pied avocet
Birds of Eurasia
Birds of East Africa
Birds of Southern Africa
Birds of North Africa
Birds of South Asia
pied avocet
pied avocet
Articles containing video clips